Edward James Kavanagh (3 July 1888 – 16 March 1960) was a New Zealand Rugby Union and cricket player who captained the Southland Rugby Football Union and Southland cricket team. Kavanagh became one of Southland's finest all-round sporting sons.

Rugby

It was at first five-eighth playing for Athletic Club where Kavanagh won his Southland representative cap. He captained the Southland rugby team in 1914 and the New Zealand Rifle Brigade rugby team in England during World War I.

Cricket

Kavanagh graduated as one of the finest batsmen of his school and played his first representative game for Southland in the inaugural Hawke Cup of 1910-11, which saw Southland forced to play two away games and win. Kavanagh captained Southland several times and in 1921, he was called on to play against Australia. Those of his club and representative team mates claimed that but for a flaw in his concentration when compiling an innings, he would have been one of the best left-hand batsmen in New Zealand. He was also a top class spin bowler and a brilliant cover point fieldsman. Moving to the North Island, Kavanagh went on to play for Waikato, Hawke's Bay and the North Island XI.

External links

1888 births
1960 deaths
New Zealand rugby union players
New Zealand cricketers
Southland rugby union players
Southland cricketers
Rugby union fly-halves
Rugby union players from Invercargill